USC Wiesbauer Mauerbach is an association football team from Mauerbach, Austria. The club was founded in 1951, and plays in the 1.Klasse NordWest division, in Austria's lower leagues. Mauerbach's current manager is Juanito Palla, a former defender who played for Mauerbach and other lower Austrian teams.

Current squad

Squad correct as of 07 Aug. 2015.

References

Football clubs in Austria
Association football clubs established in 1951
1951 establishments in Austria